Jozo Špikić (born 31 March 1994) is a Bosnian footballer who currently plays for TSV Sauerlach in the German Kreisliga.

Club career
A native of Tomislavgrad, after playing for the local club HNK Tomislav, Špikić joined the ranks of NK Široki Brijeg in 2009, aged 15. After passing through the academy there, Špikić established himself as a first-team regular, playing in both Europa League qualifiers against Udinese Calcio as well.

In the summer of 2014 Špikić joined NK Rijeka in the Prva HNL.

In the winter of 2017 Špikić joined SC Oberweikertshofen in the German Landesliga.

References

External links
German career stats - FuPa

1994 births
Living people
People from Tomislavgrad
Croats of Bosnia and Herzegovina
Association football defenders
Bosnia and Herzegovina footballers
Bosnia and Herzegovina youth international footballers
Bosnia and Herzegovina under-21 international footballers
Competitors at the 2013 Mediterranean Games
Mediterranean Games competitors for Bosnia and Herzegovina
NK Široki Brijeg players
HNK Rijeka players
HNK Rijeka II players
NK Osijek players
NK Imotski players
Premier League of Bosnia and Herzegovina players
Croatian Football League players
Landesliga players
Bosnia and Herzegovina expatriate footballers
Expatriate footballers in Croatia
Bosnia and Herzegovina expatriate sportspeople in Croatia
Expatriate footballers in Germany
Bosnia and Herzegovina expatriate sportspeople in Germany